FK Rabotnik Lozovo is a football club based in the village of Lozovo near Sveti Nikole, North Macedonia. They recently played in the Macedonian Third League.

History
The club was founded in 1961.

References

External links
Club info at MacedonianFootball 
Football Federation of Macedonia 

Rabotnik Dzumajlija
Association football clubs established in 1961
1961 establishments in the Socialist Republic of Macedonia
FK